Ashraf Ali (born 22 April 1958 in Lahore, Punjab) is a former Pakistani cricketer who played in 8 Tests and 16 ODIs from 1980 to 1987. He was a wicketkeeper batsman. His brother Saadat Ali held the national record of maximum first-class runs in a calendar year for Lahore Gymkhana.

He holds the record for conceding most number of byes in an innings of One Day International(20)

References 

1958 births
Living people
Pakistan Test cricketers
Pakistan One Day International cricketers
Pakistani cricketers
Cricketers from Lahore
Income Tax Department cricketers
Lahore A cricketers
Pakistan Universities cricketers
Lahore City cricketers
Pakistan Railways cricketers
United Bank Limited cricketers
Lahore City Blues cricketers
Lahore City Whites cricketers
Punjab (Pakistan) cricketers
Wicket-keepers